Anbaq may refer to:
Anbaq-e Hajjikhan
Anbaq-e Javad
Anbaq-e Olya
Anbaq-e Sorkhay